Pedro Henrique Rodrigues Bicalho (born 23 April 2001), known as Pedro Bicalho, is a Brazilian footballer who plays  as a midfielder for Vitória, on loan from Palmeiras.

Career statistics

Club

Honours
Palmeiras
Copa Libertadores: 2021

References

2001 births
People from São José dos Campos
Footballers from São Paulo (state)
Living people
Brazilian footballers
Association football midfielders
Cruzeiro Esporte Clube players
Sociedade Esportiva Palmeiras players
C.D. Santa Clara players
Esporte Clube Vitória players
Campeonato Brasileiro Série A players
Primeira Liga players
Brazilian expatriate footballers
Expatriate footballers in Portugal
Brazilian expatriate sportspeople in Portugal